John L. Jackson Jr. is an American anthropologist, filmmaker, author, and university administrator. He is currently the Richard Perry University Professor and the Walter H. Annenberg Dean of the University of Pennsylvania Annenberg School for Communication. Jackson is the author of Harlemworld: Doing Race and Class in Contemporary Black America (2001); Real Black: Adventures in Racial Sincerity (2005); Racial Paranoia: The Unintended Consequences of Political Correctness (2008); Thin Description: Ethnography and the African Hebrew Israelites of Jerusalem (2013). He has also directed films that explore questions of race, diaspora, migration, and media.

Jackson earned his B.A. from Howard University and his Ph.D. in Anthropology from Columbia University. He served as a junior fellow at the Harvard University Society of Fellows before joining the Cultural Anthropology faculty at Duke University.

Personal life

Jackson is married to Deborah A. Thomas.  Thomas is the R. Jean Brownlee Professor of Anthropology in the Department of Anthropology at the University of Pennsylvania. Thomas and Jackson have two children and live in South Philadelphia.

Early life and education 
Jackson was born in 1971. He began exploring research through media when he hosted a comic radio show called "The Jackson Attraction" during his junior and senior years of high school in Brooklyn, New York. This experience gave him his first glimpse into the power of media. He dived deeper into media as an undergraduate at Howard University. In 1993, he graduated summa cum laude from Howard University with a B.A. in communications (radio, TV, and film). While attending Howard, Jackson was supported by the University Merit Scholarship (1989-1993) and the Ronald E. McNair Scholarship (1992-1993). He received a National Science Foundation Predoctoral Fellowship to pursue graduate work at Columbia University, earning an M.A. (1994), an M.Phil. (1998), and a Ph.D. (2000), with distinction, in anthropology. His dissertation was supported by the Ford Foundation Dissertation Fellowship.

Career 

After getting his doctorate, Jackson spent two years as a Junior Fellow at the Harvard University Society of Fellows in Cambridge, Massachusetts. From 2002 to 2006, he taught cultural anthropology as an assistant professor at Duke University in Durham, North Carolina. In 2006, he moved to the University of Pennsylvania and became the first Penn Integrates Knowledge (PIK) University Professor. He became the Richard Perry University Professor of Communication and Anthropology and Professor of Africana Studies and in 2014 became Dean of the University of Pennsylvania School of Social Policy and Practice. In 2019, Jackson was named Dean of the Annenberg School for Communication at the University of Pennsylvania.

Jackson is a founding member of CAMRA and PIVPE, two Penn-based groups dedicated to the creation of visual and performance research initiatives and the development of rigorous evaluation criteria.

Research

Jackson's area of study focuses on how urban people theorize and employ racial and class inequalities in everyday interactions. Jackson's research also looks at how modern urban religions are being used to promote health literacy and outcomes in marginalized and poor communities around the world. His studies also explore how to apply non-conventional methods in scholarly studies.

Real Black
In this book, Jackson proposes a new model for thinking about "authentic" black culture issues: racial sincerity. Jackson asserts that the caricatures of identity that racial authenticity impose on people locks them into stereotypes. Sincerity, Jackson argues, treats authenticity as an analytical model that seeks to deny people's freedom of choice in the search for identities. The book is based on more than a decade of ethnographic studies around New York City, including stories from police officers, conspiracy theorists, and gospel choir singers. Jackson's invented alter ego, Anthroman, finds ethnographic significance in everyday buildings, showing how race is defined, debated, imposed, and confounded every day.

Racial Paranoia

In this book, Jackson distinguishes racist paranoia (fear and suspicion of the hidden form of racism) from racism (observable act of racism and prejudice). He argues that racism actually becomes more pronounced as explicit social discrimination subsides. Jackson uses examples from current events and everyday interactions to show its serious impact on racially paranoid culture and the lives of all Americans. He explains how it is cultivated, communicated, and strengthened—and how it complicates the goal of racial equality in the United States.

Thin Description 
Thin Description: Ethnography and the African Hebrew Israelites of Jerusalem (Harvard University Press, 2013) is based on the group of African Americans from varying backgrounds who sold their belongings and left the United States to relocate to Liberia in 1966. Thin Description recounts this group’s journey from their relocation and eventual move to the modern state of Israel, where the community has lived since 1969. Through this, Jackson attempts to understand the way in which African Hebrew Israelites of Jerusalem navigate questions about the links between race and spirituality. Additionally, he explores challenges in anthropology research, especially as it pertains to conducting research on groups already searching for themselves and their identities.

Awards 
2012: SAS Teaching Award for Innovative Teaching for the way his courses explored the intersection of theory and practical components
2008-2010: University of Pennsylvania Faculty Fellow, Penn Fellow (Inaugural Cohort)
2009: President's Award, American Anthropological Association
2002: American Educational Studies Association, Critics' Choice Award
2002: Honorable Mention, John Hope Franklin Prize, American Studies Association
2001: Publishers Weekly, Notable Non-Fiction Book

Works

Books 
 Harlemworld: Doing Race and Class in Contemporary Black America (University of Chicago Press, 2001)
 Real Black: Adventures in Racial Sincerity (University of Chicago Press, 2005)
 Racial Paranoia: The Unintended Consequences of Political Correctness (Basic Civitas, 2008)
 Thin Description: Ethnography and the African Hebrew Israelites of Jerusalem (Harvard University Press, 2013)
 Impolite Conversations: On Race, Politics, Sex, Money, and Religion with Cora Daniels (Atria at Simon & Schuster, 2014)
 Televised Redemption: Black Religious Media and Racial Empowerment with Carolyn Rouse and Marla Frederick (NYU Press, 2016)

Films 
Bad Friday: Rastafari after Coral Gardens (Third World Newsreel, 2012), co-directed with Deborah A. Thomas
Making Sweet Tea: The Lives and Loves of Southern Black Gay Men, co-directed with Nora Gross and co-executive produced with E. Patrick Johnson

References

Living people
University of Pennsylvania faculty
Howard University alumni
Cultural anthropologists
Duke University faculty
Columbia Graduate School of Arts and Sciences alumni
1971 births